Harry Edward Graham (December 26, 1921 in Foxwarren, Manitoba – September 21, 2006 in Russell, Manitoba) was a politician in Manitoba, Canada. He served as a Progressive Conservative member of the Legislative Assembly of Manitoba from 1969 to 1986.

The son of George Malcolm Graham and Margaret Leckie, he was educated at the University of Manitoba, and worked as a farmer after his graduation. Graham served as Vice-Chairman of the Russell District Hospital, and was also the President of the Progressive Conservative Association in the federal riding of Marquette. In 1951, he married Velma Louise Murdoch.

He first entered politics while helping a friend, Dr. Vern Rosnoski, who was a dentist, run for office. After Rosnoski couldn't find a dentist to take over his practice who could use left-handed tools, Graham ran in his place.

He was first elected to the Manitoba legislature in a by-election on February 20, 1969, defeating Liberal Edward Shust in the riding of Birtle-Russell. The riding had previously been held by the Liberals, and Graham's victory provided an impetus for Progressive Conservative Premier Walter Weir to call a general election later in the year.

The Tories lost government to the New Democratic Party in this election, and Graham nearly lost his own seat to NDP candidate Donald Kostesky. He was re-elected again by a slightly greater margin in the 1973 election, which the NDP also won.

The Progressive Conservatives returned to power in the 1977 election under Sterling Lyon, as Graham again narrowly increased his margin of victory in Birtle-Russell. He was not appointed to cabinet, but rather served as the Speaker of the legislature from November 24, 1977 until 1981.

In 1980, Graham presided over the temporary expulsion from the legislature of Robert Wilson, who had been convicted of a criminal offence. Wilson was permanently expelled in 1981.

Graham won the easiest re-election victory of his career in the election of 1981, running in the redistributed riding of Virden. Ironically, this occurred as the PCs lost government to the NDP. Graham served as an opposition member of the Legislative Assembly for the next five years, and did not seek re-election in 1986.

He died at Russell District Hospital after a lengthy illness.

Electoral record

References

1921 births
2006 deaths
Progressive Conservative Party of Manitoba MLAs
Speakers of the Legislative Assembly of Manitoba

mr:हॅरी ग्रॅहाम